Chhoti Sadri is a town and a municipality in Pratapgarh district in the state of Rajasthan, India.

Karunda is village of chhotisadri tahasil this village is grampanchyat

Geography

Demographics
 India census, Chhoti Sadri had total population of 18,360, of which 9,326 are male and 9,034 female.

References

Cities and towns in Pratapgarh district, Rajasthan